Jis Desh Mein Ganga Rehta Hai is 2000 Indian Hindi-language comedy film directed by Mahesh Manjrekar and starring Govinda and Sonali Bendre as leads. It is a remake of the 1972 Marathi film Ekta Jeev Sadashiv, and the 1974 Kannada film Bangaarada Panjara. It was later remade in Bengali as Mayer Anchal (2003).

Plot

Gangaram, alias Ganga (Govinda), lives the simple life in a rural village with his mother (Reema Lagoo), his father (Shivaji Satam), and his lover and childhood friend, Saawni (Sonali Bendre).

When the time comes for Ganga to marry, his parents inform him that his biological parents live in the city; they want him to settle there. Ganga bids a tearful farewell to his fellow villagers and travels to the city where his birth parents live. There he meets is elder brother, who is married to Supriya, his younger siblings, as well as his wealthy birth parents, Avinash (Shakti Kapoor) and Radha (Himani Shivpuri). Ganga struggles to cope up with the modern city life. His sister-in-law dislikes him more with each passing day.

Soon word spreads that Ganga is an eligible bachelor. His parents want him to marry a socialite, Tina (Rinke Khanna). Ganga agrees to all his newfound family wants him to do, but things start to go bad for Ganga and he flees his biological parents' home. He discovers his older brother is being blackmailed by a woman and two goons. Ganga saves his brother, but one of the goons stabs his best friend, and Ganga is accused of the stabbing. Ganga refuses to speak the truth about the incident in court because he doesn't want to ruin his family's reputation. However, his sister-in-law, who has learned the truth from her husband, is able to prove Ganga's innocence in court.

After the verdict, Ganga and his best friend return to their village. There, Ganga reunites with Saawni, and his parents consent to let them get married.

Cast
 Govinda as Ganga
 Sonali Bendre as Saavni
 Rinke Khanna as Tina Dutt
 Ankush Choudhary as Rahul Vashisht
 Milind Gunaji as Milind 
 Supriya Karnik as Supriya Gokhale
 Shivaji Satam as Gangaram's Father
 Reema Lagoo as Gangaram Mother
 Shakti Kapoor as Avinash Trivedi
 Himani Shivpuri as Radha
 Kishore Nandlaskar as Sannata
 Anand Abhyankar as Tina Father
 Nandu Madhav as Iqbal Ansari
 Atul Kale as Birbal, Avinash's Secretary
 Rajendra Gupta as guest appearance in song "Pren nagar me"
 Makarand Anaspure
 Farhad Shahnawaz
 Rakhi Sawant
 Herman D'souza as villain Rakhi sawant's brother

Soundtrack
The soundtrack is on Universal Music, the music is composed by Anand Raaj Anand, while the songs are written by Dev Kohli and Praveen Bhardwaj.

References

External links

2000 films
2000s Hindi-language films
Films set in Mumbai
Films shot in Mumbai
Indian comedy-drama films
Films directed by Mahesh Manjrekar
Hindi remakes of Marathi films
Hindi remakes of Kannada films
Films scored by Anand Raj Anand
2000 comedy-drama films